Maredudd ap Tudur (died c. 1406) was a Welsh soldier and nobleman from the Tudor family of Penmynydd. He was one of five sons of Tudur ap Goronwy, and was the father of Owen Tudor. Maredudd supported the Welsh patriot Owain Glyndŵr in 1400, alongside his brothers Rhys ap Tudur and Gwilym ap Tudur; Owain was their cousin.

He was the great-grandfather of Henry VII of England and the great-great-grandfather of Henry VIII of England.

Ancestry and early life
Maredudd was one of five sons of Tudur ap Goronwy and Marged ferch Tomos (a descendant of Llywelyn Fawr); alongside Ednyfed ap Tudor, Rhys ap Tudur, Goronwy ap Tudor and Gwilym ap Tudur. Tudur had served with the forces of King Edward III of England during the campaigns in France in 1337, assuming the rank of knight in the process. Afterwards, he became a royal officer for the island of Angelsey and ensured that all of his sons found similar roles. The family were descended from Ednyfed Fychan, and his son Goronwy ab Ednyfed, the founder of the Tudor family of Penmynydd.

At some point between 1387 and 1395, Maredudd was made rhaglaw (bailiff) of the commote at Malltraeth. His brothers Rhys and Goronwy held similar roles in the commote of Dindaethwy. Maredudd was named escheator of Anglesey between 1388 and 1391, a role normally reserved by the crown for Englishmen.

Revolt
When Owain Glyndŵr led a revolt against the crown, the surviving Tudur brothers (Goronwy and Ednyfed both drowned in 1382), sided with him openly; Glyndŵr was their cousin on his mother's side of the family. But unlike Rhys and Gwilym, Maredudd was included in a general pardon in 1401 given to those who on Anglesey who supported Owain. Despite this, Maredudd again led a group of rebels in 1405, and was outlawed a year later by the king.

Maredudd's lands were confiscated by the crown, but unlike those of his brothers they were not passed to Gwilym ap Gruffydd. The rebellion ultimately failed; Rhys was executed in 1412, Gwilym ap Tudur was given a pardon in 1413, but Maredudd disappears from the historical record after 1405 and his final fate is unclear.

Legacy
Maredudd's son Owain initially used the name Owain ap Maredudd ap Tudur, but Anglicised it to become Owen Tudor. Owen married the widow of King Henry V of England, Catherine of Valois, in secret and had had three sons, Owen, Edmund and Jasper. Their half brother, King Henry VI of England, took an active interest in them and had Edmund married to Margaret Beaufort to ensure their children could inherit the throne of England. During the subsequent Wars of the Roses, Edmund's son Henry Tudor became King Henry VII of England, the founder of the House of Tudor.

Lineage

Notes

References

14th-century Welsh people
1400s deaths
Year of birth unknown
Year of death uncertain
Welsh soldiers
Welsh rebels
People from Anglesey